Tsomgo Lake, also known as Tsongmo Lake or Changgu Lake, is a glacial lake in the East Sikkim district of the Indian state of Sikkim, some  from the capital Gangtok. The lake surface reflects different colours with change of seasons and is held in great reverence by the local Sikkimese people. Buddhist monks prognosticated after studying the changing colours of the lake.

Etymology
In Bhutia language the name Tsomgo is made of two words 'Tso' meaning "lake" and 'Mgo' meaning "head" which gives the literal meaning as "source of the lake".

Topography
The lake is surrounded by steep mountains which are covered with snow during winter. During summer the snow cover melts and forms the source for the lake.

Further, the road to Nathu La skirts the lake on the north side.

Features

The lake water quality is of moderate turbidity.

The lake is the venue for the Guru Purnima festival which is also the Raksha Bandhan festival when the faith healers known as Jhakris of Sikkim assemble at the lake area to derive benefits from the healing qualities of the lake waters.

Alpine forests cover the catchment of the lake. After the winter season ends in middle of May, the periphery of lake has scenic blooms of flower species of rhododendrons (the state tree of Sikkim), primulas, blue and yellow poppies, irises and so forth. Also seen in the precincts of the lake are several species of birds including Brahminy ducks. Wildlife seen includes the red panda.

Tourist attractions at the lake site include joy rides on decorated yaks and mules where kiosks offer variety of food and drinks. There is also a small Shiva temple on the bank of the lake.

Entry permits
As the lake is located in a restricted area it is essential for all Indians visiting the area to obtain permits. In case of foreign nationals special permit is essential.

Indian Postal Service released a commemorative stamp on the lake on 6 November 2006.

Border trade market 
The nearby habitation of Changgu was declared a border trade market in 2003.

Gallery

See also

 Tilicho Lake
 Gurudongmar Lake
Nathu La

Tourist Attraction 
It is one of the biggest tourism draws in the Eastern Himalayan state of Sikkim receiving around 300,000 (3 lakh) tourists annually. The best time to visit the lake is January to March.

References

Tsomgo Lake travel guide - Permit Regulations Climate Temperature

Bibliography
 

Tsongmo
Gangtok district
Tsongmo